Hajjilar (also Romanized as Ḩājjīlār, Hājī Lār,  and Ḩājjīlar; also known as Ḩājalār) is a village in Hajjilar-e Jonubi Rural District of Hajjilar District of Chaypareh County, West Azerbaijan province, Iran. At the 2006 National Census, its population (as a village in the former Chaypareh District of Khoy County) was 1,291 in 370 households. The following census in 2011 counted 1,560 people in 428 households, by which time the district was separated from the county, established as Chaypareh County, and divided into two districts. The latest census in 2016 showed a population of 1,394 people in 434 households; it was the largest village in its rural district.

References 

Chaypareh County

Populated places in West Azerbaijan Province

Populated places in Chaypareh County